Wang Chieh-fu (born 11 September 1993) is a Taiwanese tennis player playing on the ATP Challenger Tour. On 23 April 2012, he reached his highest ATP singles ranking of 744 and his highest doubles ranking of 381 achieved on 4 May 2015.

Tour titles

Doubles

External links 
 

1993 births
Living people
Taiwanese male tennis players
Universiade medalists in tennis
Universiade silver medalists for Chinese Taipei
Medalists at the 2013 Summer Universiade
21st-century Taiwanese people